Novosphingobium endophyticum  is a Gram-negative, rod-shaped and aerobic bacterium from the genus Novosphingobium which has been isolated from the roots of the plant Glycyrrhiza uralensis from Yuli County in China.

References

External links
Type strain of Novosphingobium endophyticum at BacDive -  the Bacterial Diversity Metadatabase

Acidophiles
Bacteria described in 2016
Sphingomonadales